Lim Sun-dong (Hangul: 임선동, Hanja: 林仙東) (born August 4, 1973) is a retired South Korean professional baseball pitcher. He competed in the 1996 Summer Olympics and in the 2000 Summer Olympics, and played 11 seasons in the KBO League. He threw right-handed.

Lim was called "The next Sun Dong-yol" while in college at Yonsei University.

He pitched for the South Korea national baseball team, which won a silver medal at the 1994 Asian Games. (South Korea lost the gold medal game to Japan.) 

Upon graduation from college in 1995, Lim was drafted by two teams in two different leagues: the Daiei Hawks of Nippon Professional Baseball (who had been impressed by his work in the previous year's Asian Games), and the LG Twins of the KBO. A court battle prevented him from joining either team, and he eventually ended up playing for a Korean amateur team, the Hyundai Phoenix.

He was a member of the South Korean national baseball team which finished eighth in the 1996 tournament.

Lim finally signed with the LG Twins in 1997, playing for them for two seasons. 

He was traded to the Hyundai Unicorns in 1999. Lim won a league-leading 18 games for Hyundai in 2000, winning the KBO League Golden Glove Award, and playing for the South Korean national baseball team which won the Olympic bronze medal.  

He 14 victories for the Unicorns in 2001, but his career went downhill afterward, and he spent the bulk of the rest of his remaining seasons going back and forth between the Unicorns' Futures League club and the KBO team. When he retired in 2007 he had not won a game in the KBO since 2002.

References

External links
 
 Profile and stats on the KBO official site
 Olympics Database Profile

1973 births
Living people
LG Twins players
Hyundai Unicorns players
South Korean baseball players
Baseball players at the 1996 Summer Olympics
Baseball players at the 2000 Summer Olympics
Olympic baseball players of South Korea
Olympic bronze medalists for South Korea
Olympic medalists in baseball
Asian Games medalists in baseball
Baseball players at the 1994 Asian Games
Asian Games silver medalists for South Korea
Medalists at the 1994 Asian Games
Yonsei University alumni

Medalists at the 2000 Summer Olympics